The Selway River is a large tributary of the Middle Fork of the Clearwater River in the U.S. state of Idaho. It flows within the Selway-Bitterroot Wilderness, the Bitterroot National Forest, and the Nez Perce National Forest of North Central Idaho. The entire length of the Selway was included by the United States Congress in 1968 as part of the National Wild and Scenic Rivers Act.

The Selway River drains a  basin in Idaho County.

History 
The Selway River is home to Chinook salmon. Four salmon channels were built "in the mid-1960s by the Idaho Department of Fish and Game and by the Job Corps ... along the Selway to help re-establish the spring chinook run after hydroelectric dams were built downstream." The river was stocked with salmon eggs and fry "each fall through 1981, and again in 1985." A 1993 book about the project, Indian Creek Chronicles, won the Pacific Northwest Booksellers Association Book Award.

Flora
Cedar - Western red cedar
ferns
Firs – Douglas and grand fir
Huckleberries
Pine - ponderosa pine
Spruce - Engelmann spruce

Wildlife

Birds
Bald eagle
Grouse
Heron
Osprey
Owls
Wild turkey
Fish
Trout
bullhead
bull
rainbow or steelhead
westslope cutthroat
Salmon
Chinook
coho
Mountain whitefish
Mammals 
Bighorn sheep
American black bear
Cougar
Elk
Fisher
Gray wolf
Lynx
Moose
Mountain goat
Mule deer
Northern river otter
Skunk
Weasel
White-tailed deer
Wolverine

Recreation
Backcountry skiing
Camping
Fly fishing – Limits and catch-and-release
Hiking
Whitewater rafting – permits required
Hunting

See also
List of rivers of Idaho
List of longest streams of Idaho
List of National Wild and Scenic Rivers

References

Bibliography
Floating the Wild Selway. (1991) [Missoula, Mont.?] : U.S. Dept. of Agriculture, Forest Service, Northern Region.
Selway River Corridor: A Guide to Recreation on the Moose Creek Ranger District. (2000) Kooskia, Idaho : U.S. Dept. of Agriculture, Forest Service, Nez Perce National Forest, Moose Creek Ranger Station.
Selway River fisheries investigations : job completion report. (1979) [Idaho] : Idaho Dept. of Fish & Game.
A survey and evaluation of archaeological resources in the Magruder Corridor, Bitterroot National Forest, east-central Idaho, 1969. (1969) Pocatello, Idaho : Idaho State University Museum.

External links

 Friends of the Clearwater
 NPR Radio expeditions 
 Visit Idaho - Selway River site

Rivers of Idaho
Canyons and gorges of Idaho
Rivers of Idaho County, Idaho
Bitterroot Range
Clearwater National Forest
Lewis and Clark Expedition
Wild and Scenic Rivers of the United States